Orthotrichum casasianum is a species of moss in the family Orthotrichaceae. It is endemic to the Spanish province of Álava, in the Basque Country. It grows in less than 200 trees on the banks of the Bayas river. The species is critically endangered, and was added in 2013 to the Basque Catalog of Threatened Species.

References

Orthotrichales
Endemic flora of Spain
Plants described in 1999